Ludvy Vaillant (born 15 March 1995 in Fort-de-France, Martinique) is a French athlete competing primarily in the 400 metres hurdles. He represented his country at the 2017 World Championships reaching the semifinals. In addition, he won a bronze medal at the 2017 European U23 Championships.

His personal best in the event is 48.30 seconds set in Paris in 2019.

International competitions

References

External links

1995 births
Living people
French male sprinters
French male hurdlers
World Athletics Championships athletes for France
Sportspeople from Fort-de-France
French people of Martiniquais descent
Martiniquais athletes
Mediterranean Games gold medalists for France
Mediterranean Games silver medalists for France
Athletes (track and field) at the 2018 Mediterranean Games
Athletes (track and field) at the 2022 Mediterranean Games
Mediterranean Games medalists in athletics
Mediterranean Games gold medalists in athletics
Athletes (track and field) at the 2020 Summer Olympics
Olympic athletes of France